Barlow Park is a multi-sports facility and stadium in Parramatta Park, Cairns, Queensland, Australia.

The Park is home of Cairns District Rugby League, Cairns District Rugby Union, Cairns and District Athletics Association, Australian Sports Commission Development, Oztag, the Northern Pride RLFC and formerly Cairns FC.

Venue
The ground comprises an IAAF international athletics facility, turf sports fields at the main Barlow and West Barlow parks, and a capacity of 15,000 people including a 1,700 seat grandstand with corporate and media facilities.

History
The Cairns Sports Centre (Barlow Park) was officially opened on Saturday the 5th of December 1987. It has had various upgrades over the course of time, notably the stadium extension was opened on the 13th of August 2003.

Barlow Park has played host to international athletic events and pre-season NRL, Super Rugby and A-League matches. 2007, 2010, 2012 and 2015 the Oceania Area Championships have been held at Barlow park, seeing athletes from around the world compete, as well as international sports people such as Sir Sebastian Coe.  On 16 June 2013 the ground hosted a regular season NRL match between South Sydney Rabbitohs and Gold Coast Titans in front of a crowd of 16,118. The record attendance at the venue was set when 20,000 people attended a 2004 NRL pre-season match. The ground hosted additional NRL matches involving the Rabbitohs in 2014, 2015 and 2016.

The stadium hosted three matches in the 2017 Rugby League World Cup, including a double-header.

The venue also hosted the 2018 Australian All School Athletics Championships.

NRL Games

References

External links
Barlow Park at Austadiums
Barlow Park rleague.com
Barlow Park cricinfo.com

Rugby league stadiums in Australia
Rugby union stadiums in Australia
Cricket grounds in Australia
Athletics (track and field) venues in Australia
Northern Pride RLFC
Venues of the 2032 Summer Olympics and Paralympics
Sport in Cairns
Sports venues in Queensland
Cairns FC